This is a list of earthquakes in 1931. Only magnitude 6.0 or greater earthquakes appear on the list. Lower magnitude events are included if they have caused deaths, injury or damage. Events which occurred in remote areas will be excluded from the list as they wouldn't have generated significant media interest. All dates are listed according to UTC time. In a stark contrast to 1930, many large and destructive earthquakes occurred during 1931. The largest and deadliest event was the magnitude 7.9 earthquake which caused major devastation to China in August. New Zealand saw its worst natural disaster in February. Iran and Nicaragua had many deaths from earthquakes in the first half of the year. Other interesting events happened in Texas and the United Kingdom with the largest quakes for these areas hitting this year.

Overall

By death toll 

 Note: At least 10 casualties

By magnitude 

 Note: At least 7.0 magnitude

Notable events

January

February

March

April

May

June

July

August

September

October

November

References

1931
 
1931